The Black Panther of Ratana is a 1963 West German-Italian adventure film directed by Jürgen Roland and starring Marianne Koch, Heinz Drache, and Horst Frank.

The film's sets were designed by the art director Hans Berthel. It was shot on location in Thailand.

Cast

References

Bibliography

External links 
 

1963 films
1963 adventure films
German adventure films
Italian adventure films
West German films
1960s German-language films
Films directed by Jürgen Roland
Constantin Film films
Films shot in Thailand
1960s German films
1960s Italian films